Brian Renegar (born September 16, 1950) is an American politician who served in the Oklahoma House of Representatives from the 17th district from 2006 to 2018.

References

1950 births
Living people
Democratic Party members of the Oklahoma House of Representatives